Vandanah Seesurun  (born 1 October 1973) is a Mauritian badminton player. She competed in women's singles and women's doubles at the 1992 Summer Olympics in Barcelona.

References

External links

1973 births
Living people
Mauritian people of Indian descent
Mauritian female badminton players
Olympic badminton players of Mauritius
Badminton players at the 1992 Summer Olympics